Joseph William Myers (March 18, 1882 – February 11, 1956) was an American pitcher in  Major League Baseball, born in Wilmington, Delaware.

Myers started his organized baseball career on October 7, 1905, with the American League's Philadelphia Athletics. In his only major league start, he pitched a five-inning complete game, allowing two earned runs.

Myers then spent 1906 to 1912 in the Tri-State League. He played in York, Reading, Harrisburg, and Trenton before settling in with the Harrisburg Senators for four seasons. In 1911, he set his career-high in wins, with 19.

Myers died in 1956 in Delaware City, Delaware.

References

External links

1882 births
1956 deaths
Major League Baseball pitchers
Philadelphia Athletics players
York Penn Parks players
York White Rozes players
Reading Pretzels players
Harrisburg Senators players
Trenton Tigers players
Wilkes-Barre Barons (baseball) players
Baseball players from Wilmington, Delaware